Hakea falcata, commonly known as sickle hakea, is a shrub in the family  Proteacea and is endemic to southern Western Australia. It has narrow egg-shaped leaves, cream flowers and blooms in spring.

Description
The branchlets have a patchy covering of pale rusty-brown coloured hairs. It blooms from September to November and produces white-yellow or white-pink flowers. The fruit contain narrowly ovate shaped blackish brown seeds with a wing down one side.

Taxonomy and naming
The species was first formally described by the botanist Robert Brown in 1830 as part of the work Supplementum primum prodromi florae Novae Hollandiae. The only synonym is Hakea falcata var. falcata as described by Carl Meissner.
The specific epithet is taken from the Latin word falcatus meaning curved like a sickle, referring to the shape of the leaves.

Distribution
It is endemic to an area along the coast in the South West and Great Southern regions of Western Australia between around Busselton and Albany and with a small population isolated in the Stirling Range around Cranbrook. It is found in winter wet depressions and other damp areas growing in peaty-sandy or sandy-clay soils. The shrub is often part of the understorey in jarrah forest or open Eucalypt woodland communities.

References

falcata
Eudicots of Western Australia
Plants described in 1830
Taxa named by Robert Brown (botanist, born 1773)